Normanhurst railway station is located on the Main Northern line, serving the Sydney suburb of Normanhurst. It is served by Sydney Trains T9 Northern Line services.

History
Normanhurst station opened on 21 November 1895 as Hornsby. On 1 May 1898, it was renamed Normanhurst to avoid confusion with the present day Hornsby station, then known as Hornsby Junction.

Platforms and services

Transport links
Transdev NSW operate two routes via Normanhurst station:
587: Hornsby station to Westleigh
588: Hornsby station to Normanhurst West

Normanhurst station is served by one NightRide route:
N80:  Hornsby station to Town Hall station

References

External links

Normanhurst station details Transport for New South Wales

Railway stations in Sydney
Railway stations in Australia opened in 1895
Main North railway line, New South Wales
Hornsby Shire